"When Tomorrow Comes" is a song recorded by British pop music duo Eurythmics. It was written by group members Annie Lennox, David A. Stewart and guest keyboardist Pat Seymour. With this single and its parent album Revenge, Lennox and Stewart continued with the rock and R&B sound from their previous album Be Yourself Tonight.

Released as the lead single from the album, "When Tomorrow Comes" was a modest hit in the UK, only reaching the Top 30. It proved to be a much bigger success in Australia and Scandinavia, where it reached the Top 10. "When Tomorrow Comes" was not released as a single in the United States.

Track listing

7" Single
A: "When Tomorrow Comes" (Album Version) - 4:29
B: "Take Your Pain Away" (Album Version) - 4:34

12" Single
A: "When Tomorrow Comes" (Extended Version) - 6:37
B1: "Take Your Pain Away" (Album Version) - 4:34
B2: "When Tomorrow Comes" (Orchestral Version) - 4:28

Charts

Weekly charts

Year-end charts

References

External links

1986 songs
1986 singles
Eurythmics songs
RCA Records singles
Songs written by David A. Stewart
Songs written by Annie Lennox
Song recordings produced by Dave Stewart (musician and producer)